The 2020–21 UC San Diego Tritons men's basketball team represented the University of California, San Diego in the 2020–21 NCAA Division I men's basketball season. The Tritons, led by 8th-year head coach Eric Olen, were in their first season at the NCAA Division I level and played their games at RIMAC Arena as a member of the Big West Conference. Because of the transition period, games in the Big West did not count towards the standings or conference record, and the Tritons were ineligible for the postseason, including the Big West tournament.

Previous season 
The Tritons finished the 2019–20 season with a 30–1 record, 21–1 in California Collegiate Athletic Association (CCAA) play, to finish first in the CCAA. They later won the CCAA conference tournament with a 76–62 win over Cal Poly Pomona.

Roster

Schedule and results 

|-
!colspan=9 style=| Regular season

Source:

References 

2020–21 Big West Conference men's basketball season
2020-21
2020 in sports in California
2021 in sports in California